The Ministry of Defence and Veterans Affairs (MODVA) is a government ministry responsible for the national defence and security of Uganda. In this capacity, its role is to preserve, defend and protect the people, property, sovereignty and territorial integrity of Uganda, contributing to regional stability and supporting international peace initiatives.

History 

During the colonial days, the national defence forces were named King's African Rifles (KAR). Later the name changed to Uganda Rifles (UR) and then Uganda Army (UA). The force that fought the Uganda Bush War, from 8 February 1981 to 26 January 1986, was called the National Liberation Army. In 1995, when a new constitution was promulgated, the name was changed to Uganda People's Defence Force.

Location
The headquarters of the ministry are located in the Mbuya Military Barracks, on Chwa II Road, in the Nakawa Division of the city of Kampala, Uganda's capital and largest city.

Overview
The ministry oversees the Uganda People's Defence Forces (UPDF). This ensures that the UPDF is ultimately answerable to the people of Uganda, while it remains professional, with focus on protecting its citizens, defending national sovereignty and contributing to regional stability.

Command 

 Defence Minister: Vicent Bamulangaki Sempijja  
 State Minister for Defence: Oboth Oboth Markson 
 Chief of Defence Forces: Gen. Wilson Mbasu Mbadi 
 Deputy Chief of Defence Forces: Lt. Gen. Peter Elwelu
 Joint Chief of Staff: Maj. Gen. Leopold Kyanda
 Service Chiefs
 Land Forces Commander: Maj. General Kayanja Muhanga (since October 2022)
 Land Forces Chief of Staff: Bob Ogik (since December 2016)
 Air Force Commander: Lt. General Charles Lwanga Lutaaya (since January 2017)
 Special Forces Command Commander:  brig gen peter onzi chandia (since December 2020)
 Reserve Forces Commander: Lt. General Charles Otema (since January 2017)
 UPDF Marine Forces Commander: Brig Gen Micheal Nyarwa
 Headquarters Staff
 Chief of personnel & administration': Brig. Gen. Eugenie Ssebugwawo
 Chief of military intelligence: Major General James Birungi
 Chief of training and recruitment: Brigadier General Mathew Gureme
 Chief of logistics and engineering: Brigadier Charles Bakahumura (since January 2017)
 Chief of communications and information technology: Brigadier Michael Bossa (June 2016)
 Chief of communications and information: Colonel Victor Twesigye
 Chief political commissar: Major General Henry Masiko (since January 2017)
 Chief controller of finance: Colonel Baguma Mugume
 Chief of civil-military relations:  Brigadier Gen. Rwashande
 Chief of doctrine: Lt. General Pecos Kutesa
 Chief of legal services:  Brigadier Gen. Dr. Godard Busingye
 Chief of production: Brigadier Jacob Musajjawaza
 Chief of records: Colonel Arthur Musinguzi
 Commander of military police: Maj. Gen. Don Naabasa
 Director of medical services: Maj. Gen.Ambrose Musinguzi
 General court martial: Brig. Gen Robert Freeman Mugabe
 Chief of pensions and gratuity: Colonel Metland Bitumbika
 Commissioner National Secretariat of Patriotism Corps: Brigadier General Patrick Mwesigye

Organisational structure 
Administratively, the ministry is organised into three departments: the Department of Administration, Department of Finance, and Department of Logistics. The Permanent Secretary is the Chief Executive and Chief Accounting Officer for the entire ministry.

Leadership
The ministry is headed by a cabinet minister. The Minister of Defence, since June 2021, is Vincent Ssempijja.

List of ministers
 Mustafa Adrisi (? – 8 May 1978)
 Paulo Muwanga (December 1980 – July 1985)
 Crispus Kiyonga (1 June 2006 - 6 June 2016)
 Adolf Mwesige (6 June 2016 - 8 June 2021)
 Vincent Ssempijja (8 June 2021 - present)

See also
 Uganda People's Defence Force
 Cabinet of Uganda
 Parliament of Uganda
 Politics of Uganda

References

External links
Website of the Ministry of Defence and Veterans Affairs (Uganda)

Government ministries of Uganda
Military of Uganda
Uganda
Uganda
Organisations based in Kampala